The 2005 Four Nations Tournament was the fifth edition of this invitational women's football tournament held in China with four national teams participating in a round robin format. It was held from January 28 to February 1, 2005, in the city of Quanzhou. China won the tournament on head-to-head against Australia.

Participants

Final standings

Match results

Goalscorers

References 

2005 in women's association football
2004
2005 in Chinese football
2004–05 in German women's football
2005 in Russian football
2004–05 in Australian women's soccer
January 2005 sports events in Asia
February 2005 sports events in Asia
2005 in Chinese women's sport